The Team technical routine competition of the 2022 European Aquatics Championships was held on 11 August 2022.

Results
The event was held on 11 August at 15:00.

References

Artistic